Tony Valente may refer to:

 Tony Valente (politician) (born 1981), a Canadian politician
 Tony Valente (artist) (born 1984), a French comic artist